Kaligrafos is a non-profit organization which was founded in 1980 to promote the lettering arts. The guild is based in the Dallas / Fort Worth, Texas area, where monthly meetings are held. A variety of calligraphy workshops and classes are offered to novices and masters alike.

References

External links
 Kaligrafos website

Organizations established in 1980
Organizations based in Dallas
Calligraphy organizations, societies, and schools
1980 establishments in Texas